Dorian Dessoleil (born 7 August 1992) is a Belgian professional footballer who plays for Kortrijk, on loan from Antwerp.

Club career
On 27 August 2021, he joined Antwerp on a three-year contract.

On 27 July 2022, Dessoleil moved on a one-season loan to Kortrijk.

Career statistics

Club

Notes

References

External links

1992 births
Sportspeople from Charleroi
Footballers from Hainaut (province)
Living people
Belgian footballers
Association football midfielders
R. Charleroi S.C. players
Sint-Truidense V.V. players
R.E. Virton players
Royal Antwerp F.C. players
K.V. Kortrijk players
Belgian Pro League players
Challenger Pro League players